Gustav Klimt (14 July 1862 – 6 February 1918) was an Austrian symbolist painter and one of the most prominent members of the Vienna Secession movement. Klimt is noted for his paintings, murals, sketches, and other objets d'art. Klimt's primary subject was the female body, and his works are marked by a frank eroticism. Amongst his figurative works, which include allegories and portraits, he painted landscapes. Among the artists of the Vienna Secession, Klimt was the most influenced by Japanese art and its methods.

Early in his career, he was a successful painter of architectural decorations in a conventional manner. As he began to develop a more personal style, his work was the subject of controversy that culminated when the paintings he completed around 1900 for the ceiling of the Great Hall of the University of Vienna were criticized as pornographic. He subsequently accepted no more public commissions, but achieved a new success with the paintings of his "golden phase", many of which include gold leaf. Klimt's work was an important influence on his younger peer Egon Schiele.

Life and work

Early life

Gustav Klimt was born in Baumgarten, near Vienna in the Austrian Empire, the second of seven children—three boys and four girls. His mother, Anna Klimt (née Finster), had an unrealized ambition to be a musical performer. His father, Ernst Klimt the Elder, formerly from Bohemia, was a gold engraver. All three of their sons displayed artistic talent early on. Klimt's younger brothers were Ernst Klimt and Georg Klimt.

Klimt lived in poverty while attending the Vienna Kunstgewerbeschule, a school of applied arts and crafts, now the University of Applied Arts Vienna, where he studied architectural painting from 1876 until 1883. He revered Vienna's foremost history painter of the time, Hans Makart. Klimt readily accepted the principles of a conservative training; his early work may be classified as academic. In 1877 his brother, Ernst, who, like his father, would become an engraver, also enrolled in the school. The two brothers and their friend, Franz Matsch, began working together and by 1880 they had received numerous commissions as a team that they called the "Company of Artists". They also helped their teacher in painting murals in the Kunsthistorisches Museum in Vienna. Klimt began his professional career painting interior murals and ceilings in large public buildings on the Ringstraße, including a successful series of "Allegories and Emblems".

In 1888 Klimt received the Golden Order of Merit from Emperor Franz Josef I of Austria for his contributions to murals painted in the Burgtheater in Vienna. He also became an honorary member of the University of Munich and the University of Vienna. In 1892 Klimt's father and brother Ernst both died, and he had to assume financial responsibility for his father's and brother's families. The tragedies also affected his artistic vision and soon he would move towards a new personal style. 
Characteristic of his style at the end of the 19th century is the inclusion of Nuda Veritas (naked truth) as a symbolic figure in some of his works, including Ancient Greece and Egypt (1891), Pallas Athene (1898) and Nuda Veritas (1899). Historians believe that Klimt with the nuda veritas denounced both the policy of the Habsburgs and Austrian society, which ignored all political and social problems of that time.
In the early 1890s Klimt met Austrian fashion designer Emilie Louise Flöge (a sibling of his sister-in-law) who was to be his companion until the end of his life. His painting, The Kiss (1907–08), is thought to be an image of them as lovers which was painted five years after Klimt's 1902 full-length portrait of her. He designed many costumes that she produced and modeled in his works.

During this period Klimt fathered at least fourteen children.

Vienna Secession years

Klimt became one of the founding members and president of the Wiener Sezession (Vienna Secession) in 1897 and of the group's periodical, Ver Sacrum ("Sacred Spring"). He remained with the Secession until 1908. The goals of the group were to provide exhibitions for unconventional young artists, to bring the works of the best foreign artists to Vienna, and to publish its own magazine to showcase the work of members. The group declared no manifesto and did not set out to encourage any particular style—Naturalists, Realists, and Symbolists all coexisted. The government supported their efforts and gave them a lease on public land to erect an exhibition hall. The group's symbol was Pallas Athena, the Greek goddess of just causes, wisdom, and the arts—of whom Klimt painted his radical version in 1898.

In 1894, Klimt was commissioned to create three paintings to decorate the ceiling of the Great Hall of the University of Vienna. Not completed until the turn of the century, his three paintings, Philosophy, Medicine, and Jurisprudence were criticized for their radical themes and material, and were called "pornographic". Klimt had transformed traditional allegory and symbolism into a new language that was more overtly sexual and hence more disturbing to some. The public outcry came from all quarters—political, aesthetic and religious. As a result, the paintings (seen in gallery below) were not displayed on the ceiling of the Great Hall. This was to be the last public commission accepted by the artist. All three paintings were destroyed when retreating German forces burned Schloss Immendorf in May 1945.

His Nuda Veritas (1899) defined his bid to further "shake up" the establishment. The starkly naked red-headed woman holds the mirror of truth, while above her is a quotation by Friedrich Schiller in stylized lettering: "If you cannot please everyone with your deeds and your art, please only a few. To please many is bad."

In 1902, Klimt finished the Beethoven Frieze for the Fourteenth Vienna Secessionist exhibition, which was intended to be a celebration of the composer and featured a monumental polychrome sculpture by Max Klinger. Intended for the exhibition only, the frieze was painted directly on the walls with light materials. After the exhibition the painting was preserved, although it was not displayed again until restored in 1986. The face on the Beethoven portrait resembled the composer and Vienna Court Opera director Gustav Mahler.

During this period Klimt did not confine himself to public commissions. Beginning in the late 1890s he took annual summer holidays with the Flöge family on the shores of Attersee and painted many of his landscapes there. These landscapes constitute the only genre aside from figure painting that seriously interested Klimt. In recognition of his intensity, the locals called him Waldschrat ("forest demon").

Klimt's Attersee paintings are of sufficient number and quality as to merit separate appreciation. Formally, the landscapes are characterized by the same refinement of design and emphatic patterning as the figural pieces. Deep space in the Attersee works is flattened so efficiently to a single plane that it is believed that Klimt painted them by using a telescope.

Golden phase and critical success

Klimt's 'Golden Phase' was marked by positive critical reaction and financial success. Many of his paintings from this period included gold leaf. Klimt had previously used gold in his Pallas Athene (1898) and Judith I (1901), although the works most popularly associated with this period are the Portrait of Adele Bloch-Bauer I (1907) and The Kiss (1907–08).

Klimt traveled little, but trips to Venice and Ravenna, both famous for their beautiful mosaics, most likely inspired his gold technique and his Byzantine imagery. In 1904, he collaborated with other artists on the lavish Palais Stoclet, the home of a wealthy Belgian industrialist that was one of the grandest monuments of the Art Nouveau age. Klimt's contributions to the dining room, including both Fulfillment and Expectation, were some of his finest decorative works, and as he publicly stated, "probably the ultimate stage of my development of ornament."

In 1905, Klimt painted The Three Ages of Woman, depicting the cycle of life. He created a painted portrait of Margarete Wittgenstein, Ludwig Wittgenstein's sister, on the occasion of her marriage. Then, between 1907 and 1909, Klimt painted five canvases of society women wrapped in fur. His apparent love of costume is expressed in the many photographs of Flöge modeling clothing he had designed.

As he worked and relaxed in his home, Klimt normally wore sandals and a long robe with no undergarments. His simple life was somewhat cloistered, devoted to his art, family, and little else except the Secessionist Movement from which he and many colleagues eventually resigned. He avoided café society and seldom socialized with other artists. Klimt's fame usually brought patrons to his door and he could afford to be highly selective. His painting method was very deliberate and painstaking at times and he required lengthy sittings by his subjects. Although very active sexually, he kept his affairs discreet and he avoided personal scandal.

Klimt wrote little about his vision or his methods. He wrote mostly postcards to Flöge and kept no diary. In a rare writing called "Commentary on a non-existent self-portrait", he states "I have never painted a self-portrait. I am less interested in myself as a subject for a painting than I am in other people, above all women... There is nothing special about me. I am a painter who paints day after day from morning to night ... Whoever wants to know something about me ... ought to look carefully at my pictures."

In 1901 Hermann Bahr wrote, in his Speech on Klimt: "Just as only a lover can reveal to a man what life means to him and develop its innermost significance, I feel the same about these paintings."

Death and Vienna tributes

In 1911 his painting Death and Life received first prize in the world exhibitions in Rome. In 1915 Anna, his mother, died. Klimt died three years later in Vienna on 6 February 1918, having suffered a stroke and pneumonia brought about by the worldwide influenza epidemic of that year. He was buried at the Hietzinger Cemetery in Hietzing, Vienna. Numerous paintings by him were left unfinished. The city of Vienna, Austria had many special exhibitions commemorating the 150th anniversary of Klimt's birth in 2012.

Folios

Gustav Klimt: Das Werk

The only folio set produced in Klimt's lifetime, Das Werk Gustav Klimts, was published initially by H. O. Miethke (of Gallerie Miethke, Klimt's exclusive gallery in Vienna) from 1908 to 1914 in an edition of 300, supervised personally by the artist. The first thirty-five editions (I-XXXV) each included an original drawing by Klimt, and the next thirty-five editions (XXXVI-LXX) each with a facsimile signature on the title page. Fifty images depicting Klimt's most important paintings (1893–1913) were reproduced using collotype lithography and mounted on a heavy, cream-colored wove paper with deckle edges. Thirty-one of the images (ten of which are multicolored) are printed on Chine-collé. The remaining nineteen are high quality halftones prints. Each piece was marked with a unique signet—designed by Klimt—which was impressed into the wove paper in gold metallic ink. The prints were issued in groups of ten to subscribers, in unbound black paper folders embossed with Klimt's name. Because of the delicate nature of collotype lithography, as well as the necessity for multicolored prints (a feat difficult to reproduce with collotypes), and Klimt's own desire for perfection, the series that was published in mid-1908 was not completed until 1914.

Each of the fifty prints was categorized among five themes:
 Allegorical (which included multicolored prints of The Golden Knight, 1903 and The Virgin, c. 1912)
 Erotic-Symbolist (Water Serpents I and Water Serpents II, both c. 1907–08 and The Kiss, c. 1908)
 Landscapes (Farm Garden with Sunflowers, 1907)
 Mythical or Biblical (Pallas Athena, 1898; Judith and The Head of Holofernes, 1901; and Danaë, c. 1908)
 Portraits (Emilie Flöge, 1902)

The monochrome collotypes as well as the halftone works were printed with a variety of colored inks ranging from sepia to blue and green. Emperor Franz Joseph I of Austria was the first to purchase a folio set of Das Werk Gustav Klimts in 1908.

Fünfundzwanzig Handzeichnungen
Fünfundzwanzig Handzeichnungen ("Twenty-five Drawings") was released the year after Klimt's death. Many of the drawings in the collection were erotic in nature and just as polarizing as his painted works. Published in Vienna in 1919 by Gilhofer & Ranschburg, the edition of 500 features twenty-five monochrome and two-color collotype reproductions, nearly indistinguishable from the original works. While the set was released a year after Klimt's death, some art historians suspect he was involved with production planning because of the meticulous nature of the printing (Klimt had overseen the production of the plates for Das Werk Gustav Klimts, making sure each one was to his exact specifications, a level of quality carried through similarly in Fünfundzwanzig Handzeichnungen). The first ten editions also each contained an original Klimt drawing.

Many of the works contained in this volume depict erotic scenes of nude women, some of whom are masturbating alone or are coupled in sapphic embraces. When a number of the original drawings were exhibited to the public, at Gallerie Miethke in 1910 and the International Exhibition of Prints and Drawings in Vienna in 1913, they were met by critics and viewers who were hostile towards Klimt's contemporary perspective. There was an audience for Klimt's erotic drawings, however, and fifteen of his drawings were selected by Viennese poet Franz Blei for his translation of Hellenistic satirist Lucian's Dialogues of the Courtesans. The book, limited to 450 copies, provided Klimt the opportunity to show these more lurid depictions of women and avoided censorship thanks to an audience composed of a small group of (mostly male) affluent patrons.

Gustav Klimt An Aftermath
Composed in 1931 by editor Max Eisler and printed by the Austrian State Printing Office, Gustav Klimt An Aftermath was intended to complete the lifetime folio Das Werk Gustav Klimts. The folio contains thirty colored collotypes (fourteen of which are multicolored) and follows a similar format found in Das Werk Gustav Klimts, replacing the unique Klimt-designed signets with gold-debossed plate numbers. One hundred and fifty sets were produced in English, with twenty of them (Nos. I–XX) presented as a "gala edition" bound in gilt leather. The set contains detailed images from previously released works (Hygeia from the University Mural Medicine, 1901; a section of the third University Mural Jurisprudence, 1903), as well as the unfinished paintings (Adam and Eve, Bridal Progress).

Paintings

Drawings

In 1963, the Albertina museum in Vienna began researching the drawings of Gustav Klimt. The research project Gustav Klimt. Die Zeichnungen, has since been associated with intensive exhibition and publication activities.

Between 1980 and 1984 Alice Strobl published the three-volume catalogue raisonné, which records and describes all drawings by Gustav Klimt known at the time in chronological order. An additional supplementary volume was published in 1989. In the following year Strobl transferred her work to the art historian and curator Marian Bisanz-Prakken, who had assisted her since 1975 in the determination and classification of the works and who continues the research project to this day. Since 1990, Marian Bisanz-Prakken has redefined, documented, and scientifically processed around 400 further drawings.

This makes the Albertina Vienna the only institution in the world that has been examining and scientifically classifying the artist's works for half a century. The research project now includes information on over 4,300 works by Gustav Klimt.

Selected works

 Klimt University of Vienna Ceiling Paintings
 Palais Stoclet mosaic in Brussels
 Fable (1883)
 Idylle (1884)
 The Theatre in Taormina (1886–1888), Burgtheater, Vienna
 Auditorium in the Old Burgtheater, Vienna (1888)
 Portrait of Joseph Pembauer, the Pianist and Piano Teacher (1890)
 Ancient Greece II (Girl from Tanagra) (1890–91)
 Portrait of a Lady (Frau Heymann?) (1894)
 Music I (1895)
 Love (1895)
 Sculpture (1896)
 Tragedy (1897)
 Music II (1898)
 Pallas Athene (1898)
 Flowing water (1898)
 Portrait of Sonja Knips (1898)
 Fish Blood (1898)
 Schubert at the Piano (destroyed 1899)
 After the Rain (Garden with Chickens in St Agatha) (1899)
 Nymphs (Silver Fish) (1899)
 Mermaids (1899)
 Philosophy (1899–1907)
 Nuda Veritas (1899)
 Portrait of Serena Lederer (1899)
 Medicine (Hygieia) (1900–1907)
 Music (Lithograph) (1901)
 Judith I (1901)
 Buchenwald (Birkenwald) (1901)
 Gold Fish (To my critics) (1901–02)
 Portrait of Gertha Felsovanyi (1902)
 Portrait of Emilie Flöge (1902)
 Beech Forest (1902)
 Beech Grove I (1902)
 Beethoven Frieze (1902)
 Beech woods (1903)
 Hope (1903)
 Pear Tree (1903)
 Life is a struggle (1903)
 Jurisprudence (1903–1907)
 Water Serpents I (1904–1907)
 Water Serpents II (1904–1907)
 The Three Ages of Woman (1905)
 Portrait of Margaret Stonborough-Wittgenstein (1905)
 Farm Garden (Flower Garden) (1905–06)
 The Stoclet Frieze (1905–1909)
 Portrait of Fritsa Reidler (1906)
 Sunflower (1906–07)
 Farm Garden with Sunflowers (1907)
 Danaë (1907)
 Portrait of Adele Bloch-Bauer I (1907)
 Poppy Field (1907)
 Hope II (1907–08)
  on the Attersee I (1908)
 The Kiss (1907–08)
 Lady with Hat and Feather Boa (1909)
 The Tree of Life (1909)
 Judith II (Salomé) (1909)
 Black Feather Hat (Lady with Feather Hat) (1910)
 Schloss Kammer on the Attersee III (1910)
 The Park (1910)
 Death and Life (1911)
 Cottage Garden with Crucifix (destroyed) (1911–12)
 Apple Tree (1912)
 Forester's House, Weissenbach on Lake Attersee (1912)
 Portrait of Mäda Gertrude Primavesi (1912)
 Portrait of Adele Bloch-Bauer II (1912)
 The Maiden (Die Jungfrau) (1913)
 Semi-nude seated, reclining (1913)
 Semi-nude seated, with closed eyes (1913)
 Portrait of Eugenia Primavesi (1913–14)
 Lovers, drawn from the right (1914)
 Portrait of Elisabeth Bachofen-Echt (1914)
 Semi-nude lying, drawn from the right (1914–15)
 Portrait of Friederike Maria Beer (1916)
 Houses in Unterach on the Attersee (1916)
 Death and Life (1916)
 Garden Path with Chickens (destroyed)(1916)
 The Girl-Friends (destroyed) (1916–17)
 Woman seated with thighs apart, drawing (1916–17)
 The Dancer (1916–1918)
 Leda (destroyed) (1917)
 Portrait of a Lady, en face (1917–18)
 The Bride (unfinished, 1917–18)
 Adam and Eve (unfinished, 1917–18)
 Portrait of Johanna Staude (unfinished, 1917–18)

Legacy

Posthumous auction history
Klimt's paintings have brought some of the highest prices recorded for individual works of art. In November 2003, Klimt's Landhaus am Attersee sold for $29,128,000, but that sale was soon eclipsed by prices paid for Willem de Kooning's Woman III and later Klimt's own Adele Bloch-Bauer II, the latter of which sold for $150 million in 2016. More frequently than paintings, however, the artist's works on paper can be found on the art market. The art market database Artprice lists 67 auction entries for paintings, but 1564 for drawings and watercolors. However, the majority of the art trade traditionally takes place privately   through galleries such as Wienerroither & Kohlbacher, which specialize in the trade with original works by Gustav Klimt and Egon Schiele and regularly present these at monographic exhibitions and international art fairs.

In 2006, the 1907 portrait, Adele Bloch-Bauer I, was purchased for the Neue Galerie New York by Ronald Lauder reportedly for US$135 million, surpassing Picasso's 1905 Boy With a Pipe (sold 5 May 2004 for $104 million), as the highest reported price ever paid for a painting up to that point.

On 7 August 2006, Christie's auction house announced it was handling the sale of the remaining four works by Klimt that were recovered by Maria Altmann and her co-heirs after their long legal battle against Austria (see Republic of Austria v. Altmann). Altmann's fight to regain her family's paintings has been the subject of a number of documentary films, including Adele's Wish.  Her struggle also became the subject of the dramatic film the Woman in Gold, a movie inspired by Stealing Klimt, the documentary featuring Maria Altmann herself. The portrait of Adele Bloch-Bauer II was sold at auction in November 2006 for $88 million, the third-highest priced piece of art at auction at the time. The Apple Tree I (c. 1912) sold for $33 million, Birch Forest (1903) sold for $40.3 million, and Houses in Unterach on Lake Atter (1916) sold for $31 million. Collectively, the five restituted paintings netted more than $327 million.  The painting Litzlberg am Attersee was auctioned for $40.4 million November 2011.

Visual art

According to the writer Frank Whitford: "Klimt of course, is an important artist—he's a very popular artist—but in terms of the history of art, he's a very unimportant artist. Although he sums up so much in his work, about the society in which he found himself—in art historical terms his effect was negligible. So he's an artist really in a cul-de-sac." Klimt's work had a strong influence on the paintings of Egon Schiele, with whom he would collaborate to found the Kunsthalle (Hall of Art) in 1917, to try to keep local artists from going abroad. Artists who reinterpreted Klimt's work include Slovak artist Rudolf Fila.

Cultural influence
Already during his lifetime Klimt influenced other artists, such as the Italian Liberty style artist Galileo Chini (1873 – 1956). Klimt was exhibited at the 1910 Venice Biennale. Chini and Vittorio Zecchin (1878 – 1947) created a number of panels in 1914 for the Venice Hotel Terminus called "La Primavera" and "Mille e una notte". These were later exhibited in the Boncompagni Ludovisi Decorative Art Museum.

In 2006, an Austrian art-house biographical film about his life was released starring John Malkovich as Klimt. In 2008, the Couturier John Galliano found inspiration for the Christian Dior Spring-Summer 2008 haute couture collection in Klimt's work.

Several of Klimt's most famous works from his golden period inspired the title sequence for the animated adaptation of the manga series, Elfen Lied, in which the art is recreated to fit with the series' own characters and is arranged as a montage with the song "Lilium". The opening to the anime Sound of the Sky also is largely inspired by Klimt's works, which was also directed by the same director as Elfen Lied. The design of the land of Centopia on the TV series Mia and Me is inspired by Klimt's works. The art of the video game Transistor also uses patterns and embellishments inspired by Klimt.

Gustav Klimt and his work have been the subjects of many collector coins and medals, such as the 100 Euro Painting Gold Coin, issued on 5 November 2003, by the Austrian Mint. The obverse depicts Klimt in his studio with two unfinished paintings on easels.

Tawny Chatmon, an American photographic artist known for her portraits of Black children overlaid with gold leaf and paint, has sought to place Black figures in glittering gold clothing inspired by Klimt’s lavish portraits of white Viennese women.

Elements of the portrait First Lady Michelle Obama, by Amy Sherald in 2018, have been noted by art critics to have been influenced by Klimt, in particular the Portrait of Adele Bloch-Bauer I. One commentator noted the similarity to fashion designed by Klimt's muse Emilie Louise Flöge.

Commemoration of 150th anniversary of birth
In addition to the permanent exhibitions on display, the city of Vienna, Austria celebrated the 150th anniversary of the birth of Klimt with special exhibitions throughout the city. Guided walking tours through the city allowed people to see some of the buildings where Klimt worked.

Google commemorated Gustav Klimt with a Google doodle celebrating Klimt's painting The Kiss on his 150th birthday, 14 July 2012.

In 2012, the Austrian Mint began a five-coin gold series to coincide with the 150th anniversary of Klimt's birth. The first 50 Euro gold coin was issued on 25 January 2012 and featured a portrait of Klimt on the obverse and a portion of his painting of Adele Bloch-Bauer.

Gustav Klimt Foundation
In 2013, the Gustav Klimt Foundation was set up by Ursula Ucicky, widow of Klimt's illegitimate son Gustav Ucicky, with a mission to "preserve and disseminate Gustav Klimt's legacy." The managing director of the Leopold Museum, Peter Weinhäupl, was appointed as Chairman of the foundation. As a reaction, the museum's director Tobias G. Natter resigned in protest, citing Ucicky's past as a Nazi propaganda film-maker.

Nazi looted art: restitution and litigation
In 2000, a government committee recommended that Klimt's Lady with Hat and Feather Boa, in Belvedere Museum in Vienna, be restituted to the heirs of the Jewish family that had owned it before the Nazi Anschluss.

National Public Radio reported on 17 January 2006 that "The Austrian National Gallery is being compelled by a national arbitration board to return five paintings by Gustav Klimt to a Los Angeles based woman, the heir of a Jewish family that had its art stolen by the Nazis. The paintings are estimated to be worth at least $150 million." This incident, involving Maria Altmann, was subsequently made into the Hollywood movie Woman in Gold, starring Helen Mirren.

The paintings were sold by auction house Christie's for $325 million in 2006.

In 2021 the French minister of culture announced that the only Klimt in France's national collections was Nazi loot which should be restituted to the heirs of the Jewish family that had been persecuted by Nazis. Rosebushes Under the Trees, painted in 1905, had been owned by Nora Stiasi, who had been forced to sell it before being murdered by the Nazis. It is currently hanging in France's Orsay Museum which purchased it from Swiss art dealer Peter Nathan in 1980.

A similar painting, also painted by Klimt and known as Apple Trees II, which was also Nazi loot, was mistakenly returned to the wrong family by the Austrian authorities.

Other Klimts that have been the object of ownership battles owing to a history of Nazi looting include the Beethoven Frieze, Water Snakes II,  Blooming Meadow and Portrait of Gertrude Lowe.

See also

 Bride of the Wind (biopic)
 Gustav Klimt's list of paintings
 Japonism
 Klimt Villa
 Lost artworks
 List of Austrian artists and architects
 List of claims for restitution for Nazi-looted art
 Portrait of Adele Bloch-Bauer I

References

Bibliography
Tobias G. Natter, Max Hollein (Eds.): Klimt & Rodin: An Artistic Encounter, DelMonico Books - Prestel Publishing, Munich 2017, .
Tobias G. Natter (Ed.): Gustav Klimt:  The Complete Paintings, Taschen, Cologne 2012, .
 O'Connor, Anne-Marie (2012). The Lady in Gold, The Extraordinary Tale of Gustav Klimt's Masterpiece, Portrait of Adele Bloch-Bauer, Alfred A. Knopf, New York, .
 Tobias G. Natter, Christoph Grunenberg (Eds.):Gustav Klimt. Painting, Design and Modern Life, Tate Publishing, London 2008, .
 .
 .
 .
 .
Salfellner, Harald (2018), Klimt. An Illustrated Life. Vitalis Verlag. .

Further reading

Kallir, Jane, Alfred Weidinger: Gustav Klimt. In Search of the Total Artwork. Prestel, New York 2009, 
Kränsel, Nina: Gustav Klimt. Prestel, 2007, 
Weidinger, Alfred. Klimt. Catalogue Raisonné, Prestel, New York, 2007, 
Czernin, Hubertus: Die Fälschung: Der Fall Bloch-Bauer und das Werk Gustav Klimts. Czernin Verlag, Vienna 2006. 
 Tobias G. Natter, Max Hollein (Eds.): The Naked Truth: Klimt, Schiele, Kokoschka and other Scandals, Prestel, Munich, 2005, .
 Tobias G. Natter: Die Welt von Klimt, Schiele und Kokoschka. Sammler und Mäzene, DuMont, Cologne 2003, .
Schorske, Carl E. "Gustav Klimt: Painting and the Crisis of the Liberal Ego" in Fin-de-Siècle Vienna: Politics and Culture. Vintage Books, 1981.

External links

Adele's Wish Documentary film on the Bloch-Bauer court case (Republic of Austria v. Altmann)
The Bloch-Bauer court case
Klimt's Last Retrospective by Monica Strauss

"This Kiss to the Whole World" Klimt and the Vienna Secession (NYARC)
iKlimt, The Life and Work of Gustav Klimt
 Klimt vs. Klimt: Google's Pocket Galery, including three paintings colorized by AI, cf. A.I. Digitally Resurrects Trio of Lost Gustav Klimt Paintings

 
1862 births
1918 deaths
19th-century Austrian painters
19th-century male artists
20th-century Austrian male artists
20th-century Austrian painters
Artists from Vienna
Art Nouveau artists
Art Nouveau painters
Austrian male painters
Austrian people of Czech descent
Deaths from Spanish flu
Gustav
Members of the Vienna Secession
People from Penzing (Vienna)
Symbolist painters
Wiener Werkstätte